Eigil Johansen (born 28 September 1915, date of death unknown) was a Danish wrestler. He competed in the men's freestyle bantamweight at the 1952 Summer Olympics.

References

1915 births
Year of death missing
Danish male sport wrestlers
Olympic wrestlers of Denmark
Wrestlers at the 1952 Summer Olympics
Sportspeople from Copenhagen